TATB, triaminotrinitrobenzene or 2,4,6-triamino-1,3,5-trinitrobenzene is an aromatic explosive, based on the basic six-carbon benzene ring structure with three nitro functional groups (NO2) and three amine (NH2) groups attached, alternating around the ring.

TATB is a very powerful explosive (somewhat less powerful than RDX, but more than TNT), but it is extremely insensitive to shock, vibration, fire, or impact.  Because it is so difficult to detonate by accident, even under severe conditions, it has become preferred for applications where extreme safety is required, such as the explosives used in nuclear weapons, where accidental detonation during an airplane crash or rocket misfiring would present extreme dangers.  All British nuclear warheads use TATB-based explosives in their primary stage.  According to David Albright, South Africa's nuclear weapons used TATB to increase their safety.

TATB is normally used as the explosive ingredient in plastic bonded explosive compositions, such as PBX-9502, LX-17-0, and PBX-9503 (with 15% HMX). These formulations are described as insensitive high explosives (IHEs) in nuclear weapons literature.

Though it could theoretically be mixed with other explosive compounds in castable mixtures or other use forms, the applications for such forms would be unclear since they would largely undo the insensitivity of pure TATB.

Properties

At a pressed density of 1.80, TATB has a velocity of detonation of 7,350 meters per second.

TATB has a crystal density of 1.93 grams/cm3, though most forms currently in use have no higher density than 1.80 grams/cm3. TATB melts at 350 °C. The chemical formula for TATB is C6(NO2)3(NH2)3.

Pure TATB has a bright yellow color.

TATB has been found to remain stable at temperatures at least as high as 250 °C for prolonged periods of time.

Production

TATB is produced by nitration of 1,3,5-trichlorobenzene to 1,3,5-trichloro-2,4,6-trinitrobenzene, then the chlorine atoms are substituted with amine groups using ammonolysis.

However, it is likely that the production of TATB will be switched over to a process involving the nitration and transamination of phloroglucinol, since this process is milder, cheaper, and reduces the amount of ammonium chloride salt produced in waste effluents (greener).

Still another process has been found for the production of TATB from materials that are surplus to military use. 1,1,1-trimethylhydrazinium iodide (TMHI) is formed from the rocket fuel unsymmetrical dimethylhydrazine (UDMH) and methyl iodide, and acts as a vicarious nucleophilic substitution (VNS) amination reagent. When Picramide, which is easily produced from Explosive D, is reacted with TMHI it is aminated to TATB. Thus, materials that would have to be destroyed when no longer needed are converted into a high value explosive.

See also
FOX-7
Plastic bonded explosive
RE factor

Notes

References
 Cooper, Paul W., Explosives Engineering, New York: Wiley-VCH, 1996.  
 Michell, Alexander R., et al.; Conversion of the Rocket Propellant UDMH to a Reagent Useful in Vicarious Nucleophilic Substitution Reactions; Lawrence Livermore National Laboratory; UCRL-JC-122489

Explosive chemicals
Nitrobenzenes
Anilines